Saint-Pierre-des-Ifs may refer to:
Saint-Pierre-des-Ifs, Calvados, France
Saint-Pierre-des-Ifs, Eure, France